Mărăcineni is the name of several places in Romania:

Mărăcineni, Argeș
Mărăcineni, Buzău